This is a list of ports and harbors in Greece.

Maritime ports

The busiest maritime ports for passenger transport are:
Aegina
Antirrio
Corfu
Heraklion
Igoumenitsa
Keramoti
Kyllini
Mykonos
Paloukia (Salamis)
Paros
Patras
Perama
Piraeus
Rafina
Rio
Souda Bay (Crete)
Thasos
Thira (Santorini)
Tinos
Zakynthos

The busiest maritime ports for goods transport are:
Agioi Theodoroi
Aliveri (Euboea)
Amaliapoli/Almyros
Antikyra
Antirrio
Eleusis 
Heraklion
Igoumenitsa
Kavala
Larymna
Megara
Milos
Paloukia (Salamis)
Patras
Perama
Piraeus
Rio
Thessaloniki
Volos

Gallery

See also
Transport in Greece
Greek shipping

References

Greece

Ports
Ports